New Market is an area and business district of Bhopal, Madhya Pradesh, India.

A commercial centre; the district is characterised by offices, new businesses and trade establishments.

History

Between 1975-91 small industrial units were created in New Market. 

Tatya Tope Nagar Sports Complex is located within the New Market area.

References

Bhopal district